Kurilovo is a rural locality (a village) in the Zhukovsky District, Kaluga Oblast, Russia. Population:

References 

Rural localities in Kaluga Oblast